Crăiești may refer to several places in Romania:

 Crăiești, a commune in Mureș County
 Crăiești, a village in Stănișești Commune, Bacău County
 Crăiești, a village in Vârlezi Commune, Galați County
 Crăiești, a village in Adămuș Commune, Mureș County
 Crăiești, a village in Bozieni Commune, Neamț County